Jeremy Richard Griffiths (born March 22, 1978, in Fairview, Ohio) is a former Major League Baseball pitcher for the New York Mets and Houston Astros.

Career
Griffiths spent three years as a pitcher for the University of Toledo baseball team. In 1998, he played collegiate summer baseball with the Wareham Gatemen of the Cape Cod Baseball League. Griffiths was the Mid-American Conference Baseball Pitcher of the Year as a junior in 1999. Toledo qualified for the MAC Tournament that year and Griffiths was later chosen by the New York Mets in the third round of the 1999 Major League Baseball Draft.

Griffiths appeared briefly in the major leagues in 2003 and 2004. In nine games (and six starts) with the Mets in 2003, Griffiths struggled to an earned run average (ERA) over 7.00. In the summer of 2004, Griffiths and David Weathers were traded to the Houston Astros in exchange for Richard Hidalgo. He pitched in one game for the 2004 Astros; he started the game and gave up five runs in  innings. He returned to the Class AAA New Orleans Zephyrs, where he had spent most of the 2004 season; he had a 5.85 ERA in 15 games with New Orleans that year.

In , Griffiths played for the Astros Triple-A affiliate, the Round Rock Express, but was released on June 19. He then signed with the independent Nashua Pride of the Atlantic League where in 5 starts, he went 0-2 and had an ERA of 16.33.

References

External links

Living people
Baseball players from Ohio
Major League Baseball pitchers
New York Mets players
Houston Astros players
St. Lucie Mets players
Norfolk Tides players
New Orleans Zephyrs players
Round Rock Express players
Toledo Rockets baseball players
Wareham Gatemen players
Binghamton Mets players
1978 births
Nashua Pride players
People from Fairview, Ohio
Capital City Bombers players
Kingsport Mets players